Alaskoceras is a genus of lower Ordovician coiled nautiloid cephalopods; the shell moderately expanded, ribbed, with a divergent living chamber; whorl section more broadly rounded ventrally than dorsally; siphuncle marginal at maturity, septal necks short, almost achoanitic; connecting rings thick, layered.

Alaskcoceras belongs to the Tarphycerida, and to the family Estonioceratidae. It was found in Alaska.

References

 W.M Furnish & Brian F. Glenister, 1964. Nautiloidea-Tarphycerida. Treatise on Invertebrate Paleontology, Part K. Geological Society of America and University of Kansas Press.

Ordovician cephalopods of North America
Prehistoric nautiloid genera